The Asia/Oceania Zone  was one of the three zones of regional Davis Cup competition in 2010.  It was divided into four groups.  Teams in Group IV competed for promotion to Group III for 2011.

The Group IV tournament was held in the Week commencing April 19th, 2010 in Amman, Jordan, on outdoor hard courts.

Participating teams

Format
The nine teams played in two groups, in round-robin format. Each tie consisted of two singles and one doubles match, each best-of-three sets. The winners of each group played off against the second-placed teams from the other group for promotion to the Asia/Oceania Zone Group III for 2011.

Group A

Results of Individual Ties

Group B

Results of Individual Ties

Promotion Playoffs

United Arab Emirates and Myanmar promoted to Group III for 2011.

5th–8th Playoffs

References

External links
Davis Cup draw details

Asia/Oceania Zone Group IV
Davis Cup Asia/Oceania Zone